Gonzalo Sebastián Prósperi (born 3 June 1985) is a retired Argentine professional footballer who plays as a right-back.

Career
Prósperi began his professional playing career with Godoy Cruz in 2005, after making 16 appearances for the club he was signed by Argentinos Juniors in 2006. He played on a fairly regular basis between 2006 and 2009 and in 2009 he became a near permanent fixture in the first team squad after the appointment of Claudio Borghi as manager.

Prósperi was an important member of the Argentinos Juniors team that won the Clausura 2010 championship. He played in 18 of the club's 19 games during their championship winning campaign. He joined San Lorenzo in 2012, he went onto make 56 appearances across his first five seasons with the team. Ahead of the 2016–17 Argentine Primera División season, he joined Banfield on loan.

Honours
Argentinos Juniors
Argentine Primera División: 2010 Clausura

San Lorenzo
Argentine Primera División: 2013 Inicial
Copa Libertadores: 2014
Supercopa Argentina: 2015

References

External links
  Statistics at Futbol XXI
 Football-Lineups player profile

1985 births
Living people
Footballers from Buenos Aires
Argentine footballers
Association football defenders
Argentine Primera División players
Argentinos Juniors footballers
Godoy Cruz Antonio Tomba footballers
San Lorenzo de Almagro footballers
Club Atlético Banfield footballers
San Martín de San Juan footballers